Akysis pulvinatus is a species of stream catfish. It is only known from the western half of the Kra Isthmus (i.e. in streams flowing into the Andaman Sea) in southern Thailand.

This is a small catfish, none of the type specimens exceeding 30 mm standard length. Like most Akysis spp. it is brown with yellowish patches but can be distinguished from its congeners by a combination of characters including a yellowish snout, an adipose fin with a long base, a relatively deep caudal peduncle and a forked caudal fin with the lower lobe longer than the upper. Not much is known about the species including population, threats and conservations actions except that it may be caught as bycatch in artisanal fisheries.

References

External links 

Akysidae
Fish described in 2007
Fish of Thailand
Endemic fauna of Thailand